Estate violenta (U.S. title: Violent Summer) is a 1961 Italian award-winning black-and-white drama film directed by Valerio Zurlini, depicting a love affair between a prominent Fascist's young draft-dodging son, portrayed by Jean-Louis Trintignant, and a naval officer's widow, older than he, portrayed by Eleonora Rossi Drago. It is set in the Italian seaside resort of Riccione in July 1943, around the time of the dismissal of Benito Mussolini, during the Allied invasion of Sicily in World War II. Estate violenta is Zurlini's second feature film, with which he made his name as a director.

Plot
Carlo Caremoli (Trintignant) arrives in Riccione, and enjoys life together with his friends at his father's villa. Riccione is still peaceful, and only a few things remind about the war fought in the south. On seaside holiday, the youth witness a German fighter flying low over the beach and causing panic among the crowd. Carlo tries to protect a frightened little girl who runs toward him, and meets her mother, Roberta (Rossi Drago), a naval officer's widow. Carlo is attracted to Roberta, often meets her and even makes a trip with her to San Marino, although Roberta's mother (Lilla Brignone) disapproves of this new acquaintance, and urges her to stay away from Carlo, partly because of his father, Ettore Caremoli (Enrico Maria Salerno), a brutal Fascist. Meanwhile, Maddalena (Federica Ranchi), the young sister of Roberta's deceased husband, arrives from Catanzaro, fleeing the impending war. Maddalena spends time with Carlo's friends, and  together with Roberta, is invited to a circus. However, the show is interrupted by an air raid blackout, and the friends proceed to a nighttime party at Carlo's villa. After watching flares in the night sky, the men and women form couples and start dancing to a record of Temptation, Carlo with his girlfriend Rosanna (Jacqueline Sassard), and Roberta with a much younger boy. The camera cuts between Carlo and Roberta, staring at each other passionately. Carlo asks Roberta for the next dance, and the couple end up kissing in the garden, which deeply hurts Rosanna. The next day, Roberta initially refuses to admit her true feelings to Carlo, but ultimately accedes. Meanwhile, on 25 July, the news of Mussolini's ouster is announced. Carlo and Roberta continue to go on dates. However, Carlo's father is forced to flee, and his villa is confiscated by the military authorities. Carlo meets Roberta once again and spends a night with her, provoking  discontent from her mother, and Maddalena decides to leave. During a curfew, a patrol discovers the couple on the beach and finds out that Carlo's military exemption has expired. As his father has fled, he has no chance to renew it anymore. Roberta proposes that he hide at her villa in Rovigo, and the next morning they take a train. However, during the trip the tracks are bombed during an Allied air raid, and the couple barely escape death. After the air raid, Roberta gets back on the train, but Carlo refuses to join her until the war is over, and they part as the train leaves.

Awards
Mar del Plata Film Festival: Best Actress (Eleonora Rossi Drago).
Nastro d'Argento: Best Actress (Eleonora Rossi Drago), Best Score (Mario Nascimbene).

References

External links

 
USA DVD information 

1961 films
1961 drama films
French black-and-white films
1960s Italian-language films
War romance films
Italian Campaign of World War II films
Titanus films
Films set in Italy
Films set in Emilia-Romagna
Films directed by Valerio Zurlini
Films with screenplays by Suso Cecchi d'Amico
Films scored by Mario Nascimbene